Veniamin Vasilievich Soldatenko (born 4 January 1939) is a retired Soviet athlete who competed mainly in the 50 km walk. He acquired Kazakhstani citizenship after the dissolution of the Soviet Union.

Soldatenko took up athletics in 1962 and became a member of the USSR National Team in 1967. He competed at the 1972 Summer Olympics and won the silver medal. He also won a silver medal at the 1970 World Race Walking Cup, a gold medal at the 1976 World Championships and bronze, gold and silver medals at the European Championships in 1969, 1971 and 1978, respectively. Soldatenko was awarded the Order of the Badge of Honor in 1972.

Soldatenko was the first ever IAAF world champion and remains the oldest male world champion in athletics, having taken his 50 km walk title at 37 years and 258 days. In retirement he coached race walkers in his native Kazakhstan.

References

1939 births
Living people
People from North Kazakhstan Region
Soviet male racewalkers
Kazakhstani male racewalkers
Olympic athletes of the Soviet Union
Olympic silver medalists for the Soviet Union
Athletes (track and field) at the 1972 Summer Olympics
World Athletics Championships athletes for the Soviet Union
World Athletics Championships medalists
European Athletics Championships medalists
Armed Forces sports society athletes
Medalists at the 1972 Summer Olympics
Olympic silver medalists in athletics (track and field)
World Athletics Championships winners